A by-election for the seat of Fannie Bay in the Northern Territory Legislative Assembly was held on 17 June 1995. The by-election was triggered by the resignation of Premier Marshall Perron of the Country Liberal Party (CLP). The seat had been held by Perron since 1983.

The CLP selected Fay Miller, Deputy Secretary to the Chief Minister. The Labor Party selected Clare Martin, an ABC Television and radio presenter.

Results

References

Fannie Bay by-election
Northern Territory by-elections
Fannie Bay by-election